Khan El Khalili is a 1967 Egyptian drama film directed by Atef Salem. It was entered into the 5th Moscow International Film Festival.

Cast
 Samira Ahmed
 Imad Hamdi
 Hassan Youssef

References

External links
 

1967 films
1967 drama films
1960s Arabic-language films
Egyptian black-and-white films
Films directed by Atef Salem
Films based on works by Naguib Mahfouz
Egyptian drama films